Westbroek is a village in the Dutch province of Utrecht. It is a part of the municipality of De Bilt, and lies about 6 km northwest of Bilthoven.

Westbroek consists mainly of a ribbon of farms along a dike. The village is surrounded by a number of polders: the Polder Westbroek, the Kerkeindse Polder, and the Polder Achttienhoven in the north, and the Molenpolder and Polder de Kooi in the south. The Molenpolder is a nature reserve.

History
Westbroek used to be a separate municipality. It merged into Maartensdijk in 1957, and has been a part of the De Bilt municipality since 2001.

The church dates from 1467.

On 26 December 1481, Westbroek was the site of a major battle, known as the Battle of Westbroek, between the armies of the prince-bishopric of Utrecht and Holland, with Holland winning a decisive victory.

Gallery

References

External links

Populated places in Utrecht (province)
Former municipalities of Utrecht (province)
De Bilt